Burlington USD 244 is a public unified school district headquartered in Burlington, Kansas, United States.  The district includes the communities of Burlington, New Strawn, and nearby rural areas.

Schools
The school district operates the following schools:
 Burlington High School
 Burlington Middle School
 Burlington Elementary School

See also
 Kansas State Department of Education
 Kansas State High School Activities Association
 List of high schools in Kansas
 List of unified school districts in Kansas

References

External links
 

School districts in Kansas